Carla Blanchard Dartez (born September 1965) is a Democratic former member of the Louisiana House of Representatives from District 51 (Assumption, St. Mary, and Terrebonne parishes). She was first elected to that office in 1999 and took her seat in January 2000. She resides in Morgan City in St. Mary Parish.

References

1965 births
Living people
Women state legislators in Louisiana
Democratic Party members of the Louisiana House of Representatives
21st-century American women